This is a list of the administrative regions of Greece by Human Development Index as of 2023 with data for the year 2021.

References 

Greece

Greece
Human Development Index